Gold is the debut extended play by Los Angeles-based indie pop band, Sir Sly. It was released through Interscope Records on May 21, 2013.

Track listing
"Where I'm Going" – 3:19
"Gold" – 3:51
"Found You Out" – 3:37
"Ghost" – 3:38

References 

Sir Sly EPs
2013 EPs